This is a list of reserves for waterbirds and migratory birds in Switzerland. The nature reserves on this inventory are protected by Swiss federal legislation (Federal Inventory of Water and Migratory Birds Reserves of National and International Importance).

Reserves of international importance

Reserves of national importance

See also 
 Nature parks in Switzerland

References

External links
EUNIS: Switzerland - Reserves for Waterbirds and Migrants of International and National Importance (CH09), Common Database on Designated Areas (CDDA)
Schutzgebiete: Wasser- und Zugvogelreservate 

Waterbrids and migratory birds reserves
Switzerland nature-related lists
Waterbrids and migratory birds
+
Switzerland
IUCN Category IV